The Basketball Show was a television program aired on Basketball TV, hosted by Bill Velasco. The program first aired in 2004 on  ABC later transfer to RPN in 2005. The program ended in 2007.

It was also the title of CBS Sports' NBA pregame show for the 1990 NBA playoffs, with Pat O'Brien and Bill Raftery. The program was discontinued when CBS lost rights to NBA games after that season.

See also
 List of programs aired by TV5 (Philippine TV network)
 List of programs previously broadcast by Radio Philippines Network

References

2004 Philippine television series debuts
2007 Philippine television series endings
TV5 (Philippine TV network) original programming
Radio Philippines Network original programming
Basketball mass media
Philippine sports television series